Carmen Sandiego: The Secret of the Stolen Drums is a 2004 action-adventure video game developed by A2M and published by BAM! Entertainment (European distribution being handled by Acclaim Entertainment) under license by The Learning Company. The game is based on the Carmen Sandiego series and features Cole Gannon along with Jules Argent, Shadow Hawkins and the Chief of Where in the World Is Carmen Sandiego? Treasures of Knowledge.

This game is the first in the Carmen Sandiego series to give the player complete control of a character in a 3D world. The avatar, ACME agent Cole Gannon, must maneuver through multiple stages including a museum in New York City, the beaches of New Zealand, the palace in Bangkok, Machu Picchu, and five other exotic locations. The player fights against Carmen's robots and spirits to prevent her from stealing a beautiful diamond, the repository of all the knowledge of the nations. The game also features an in-game PDA system in which Shadow and Jules can send "video mail".

Reception

The game received a mixed to negative response. It has a score of 57 on Metacritic for the Gamecube version and 53 for the Xbox version.

A review for Carmen Sandiego: The Secret of the Stolen Drums was average. The closing comments were: "Is Carmen Sandiego: The Secret of the Stolen Drums worth your hard earned cash? Well, if you're a major fan of the television show and PC games, then no. If you're a gamer looking for sweet platforming action, then no...It may [however] entertain the kiddies for a while. Otherwise, simply rent it if you're curious". The game was given a rating of 5.6/10 (Mediocre).

References

2004 video games
Action-adventure games
Secret of the Stolen Drums
GameCube games
PlayStation 2 games
Single-player video games
Video games developed in Canada
Video games set in New York City
Video games set in New Zealand
Video games set in Thailand
Video games set in the United States
Video games set in San Francisco
Xbox games
Behaviour Interactive games